is a Japanese singer-songwriter. Sugiyama's career began after joining the band "Kyutipanchosu," and subsequently winning 19th Popcon with the single, "Gospel No Yoru." After being scouted by producer Koichi Fujita, Sugiyama's band became "Kiyotaka Sugiyama & Omega Tribe," releasing five studio albums that all ranked on the Oricon charts. After breaking up the band in December 1985, he went on to have a successful solo career.

Biography

Early life and career 
Sugiyama was born in Isogo-ku, Yokohama on July 17, 1959 to his father, a police officer, and his mother, a shamisen teacher. While in elementary school, he wanted to be a manga artist and was invited to his friend Miura's house to make a manga. While in his friend's home, Miura's brother listened to The Beatles, and borrowed the record to listen to while drawing. He stopped drawing after and bought Let It Be in 5th grade with his own pocket money. He attended Yokohama Municipal Okamura Junior High School and Yokosuka Gakuin High School. In 1980, he became the lead vocalist of the band "Kyutipanchosu," which won the 19th Popcon with their song, "Gospel No Yoru." After the debut of Kyutipanchosu and receiving the Popcon prize, Sugiyama was unsatisfied with the song, feeling that it was incomplete. He refused the invitation from Popcon and sought to make his own debut. Koichi Fujita, a producer who was president of Triangle Productions, paid attention to Sugiyama after the win, presenting Sugiyama with an idea to change the band's name. In 1983, the band changed their name from "Kyutipanchosu" to "Kiyotaka Sugiyama & Omega Tribe," debuting with the single, "Summer Suspicion."

Kiyotaka Sugiyama and Omega Tribe 

The band included, of the Kyutipanchosu members, guitarist Shinji Takashima, new members Keiichi Hiroishi for drums, Takao Oshima for bass, and Kenji Yoshida for guitar, and replaced keyboardist Akira Senju with Toshitsugu Nishihara. "Summer Suspicion" peaked at No. 9 on the Oricon charts while their freshman album, Aqua City, reached No. 4. 
The band continued to make music until the end of 1985, when Sugiyama proposed that the group have a "developmental dissolution" and break up. Takashima and Nishihara initially opposed the dissolution, but the group decided that it would happen, and the greatest hits album, Single's History, would be the last album. At the suggestion of producer Tetsuji Hayashi, it was decided that they would make another album called First Finale. First Finale was released on December 11, 1985, with the band breaking up 13 days later.

Solo debut and career 
After the band disbanded, Sugiyama went to have a solo career as a vocalist. On May 28, 1986, he debuted with the single "Sayonara no Ocean," which peaked at No. 3 on the Oricon charts and sold 20 million copies. On May 27, 1987, he released his third single, "Mizu no Naka no Answer," which gave Sugiyama the No. 1 spot on the Oricon charts and gave Sugiyama his first solo hit on the Oricon charts. In 1990, he transferred from VAP to Warner Pioneer, and sometime after, transferred from Triangle Productions to Horipro.

In 2000, he was re-signed to VAP. Sometime after, he left Horipro and became independent, establishing Masterwork Co., Ltd. before reorganizing the company as Island Afternoon Co., Ltd. In 2006, Sugiyama decided to hold a concert for the 20th anniversary of his solo debut, with the order of the songs being decided by vote on the Internet. The "Solo debut 20th Anniversary The Open Air Live High & High 2006" concert was scheduled on August 6, but cancelled due to Sugiyama's poor condition at the time. Sugiyama commented, "It's the first time I've been living for 47 years and being so conscious of a cold. I'd like to continue my musical activities for the next 30 or 40 years." The event was rescheduled on September 10, with 3,000 fans gathering.

In 2013, he transferred from Warner Pioneer to King on the 30th anniversary of Omega Tribe's debut, and held tour for his 30th anniversary called "I Am Me." He held the tour "The Open Air Live "High & High 2016"" at the Hibiya Open-Air Concert Hall in 2016. He released the album "Ocean" in 2016.

In 2016, he sang a duet with actress and singer Momoko Kikuchi in the song "Kaze no Kioku." The two had previously starred in the movie Idol wo Sagase as siblings. Yasushi Akimoto, who had written songs for Sugiyama during the Omega Tribe era, wrote the song.
 
In 2019, he made his first appearance in Nippon BS Broadcasting's Momoiro Uta Gassen (ももいろ歌合戦).

Public image 
Sugiyama was known to wear a pair of sunglasses during concerts and in pictures. He did not wear sunglasses at the beginning of his career, but shortly thereafter, appeared in the media in black sunglasses. This was to hide the swelling of his face after a live performance by covering it just before his debut, but since it was well received by fans, he continues to do so. He was known during this time as "a top class man who looked good with sunglasses." However, during the performance of "Futari no Natsu Monogatari" in The Best Ten, he took off his sunglasses while singing. His face without the sunglasses can now often be seen during concerts and in photos.

Personal life 
Sugiyama married fellow singer Yuko Yanagisawa, the sister of comedian Shingo Yanagisawa who had debuted with little success and recorded narrations for Live Emotion, in 1985. The two had previously met during the after party of the 19th Popcon. They had one daughter, Maho, a year after they married. The three had moved to Hawaii and lived in Hawaii Kai, going back and forth between Los Angeles, Japan, and Hawaii for recording activities. In 1992, he was granted permanent residence for the United States. Sometime after, Yanagisawa divorced Sugiyama, and with Maho moved to the mainland U.S, where they were granted permanent U.S. residence in 2006 while Sugiyama moved back to Japan. After 10 years, Maho and Kiyotaka reunited.

Discography

Singles

Studio albums

Compilation albums

Live albums

Songs provided to other artists

References

External links 
 Official site
 Personal blog
 Island Afternoon Answer

1959 births
People from Yokohama
People from Yokosuka, Kanagawa
Musicians from Yokohama
Horipro artists
Japanese male singer-songwriters
Japanese singer-songwriters
Warner Music Japan artists
King Records (Japan) artists
Living people
Omega Tribe (Japanese band) members